ISO 3166-2:MT is the entry for Malta in ISO 3166-2, part of the ISO 3166 standard published by the International Organization for Standardization (ISO), which defines codes for the names of the principal subdivisions (e.g., provinces or states) of all countries coded in ISO 3166-1.

Currently for Malta, ISO 3166-2 codes are defined for 68 local councils.

Each code consists of two parts, separated by a hyphen. The second part is two digits (01–68).

Current codes
Subdivision names are listed as in the ISO 3166-2 standard published by the ISO 3166 Maintenance Agency (ISO 3166/MA).

ISO 639-1 codes are used to represent subdivision names in the following administrative languages:
 (en): English
 (mt): Maltese

Subdivision names are sorted in Maltese alphabetical order: a-b, ċ, d-ġ, g, għ, h, ħ, i, j-ż, z.

Click on the button in the header to sort each column.

 Notes

Changes
The following changes to the entry have been announced in newsletters by the ISO 3166/MA since the first publication of ISO 3166-2 in 1998:

See also
 Subdivisions of Malta
 NUTS codes of Malta

External links
 ISO Online Browsing Platform: MT
 Localities of Malta, Statoids.com

2:MT
ISO 3166-2
Malta geography-related lists